The Military Academy of the University of Defence is a college devoted to military education and career development located in Belgrade, Serbia. The academy forms part of the Serbian higher education system, offering accredited graduate and postgraduate curriculum. It contains a undergraduate military college (which conducts officer training) as well as postgraduate studies.

Educational program 

The following levels of studies are organized in the Military Academy:

 Undergraduate academic studies
 Postgraduate specialist studies
 Postgraduate master studies
 Postgraduate specialisations
 The Reserve Officers School
 Fundamental, applied and developing research important for raising of quality of degree-granting education, training of scientific and teaching staff and briefing students on scientific work

Undergraduate academic studies 
A professional qualification, moral completeness and physical readiness are the basis for successful realization of tasks and command of units in positioned missions and tasks, continual development and improvement of officers.

The aim of the education at the Military Academy is the education of students for the vocation of professional officer, training for initial duties at the level of the commanding officer of platoon and preparations for intellectual and ethical challenges of officer vocation, in accordance with missions and tasks given to the Armed Forces.

There are six programs of studies at the Military Academy:

 Defense Management
 Military-Electronic Engineering
 Military-Mechanical Engineering
 Military-Chemical Engineering
 Military Aviation
 Logistics

The programs of studies have many modules which provide students with vast specialist knowledge and necessary skills which an officer of the Army of Serbia has to possess.

After graduation, students become managers (defense managers), mechanical engineers (engineers of military - mechanical engineering), engineers of electrical engineering and computer science (engineers of military - electronic engineering), engineers of technology (engineers of military - chemical engineering) and engineers of traffic and transportation (engineers of military aviation – pilots) by profession. After their graduation from the first degree academic studies, students go into professional military service at the rank of second-lieutenant or they can go on with their education at the master studies organized by the Military Academy.

To these students, alongside attendance of compulsory lectures, it is also possible to acquire internationally accepted certificates: STANAG (knowledge of foreign languages) and ECDL (computer skills).

The teaching process at the Military Academy consists of active classes (lectures, exercises, and other forms of teaching) and special forms of teaching (such as camps, military training, training in winter conditions – skiing, training for steering a motor vehicle, flight training, and embarking on the ships of river units). The teaching process is organized by the teachers from the Military Academy, as well as professors from other faculties, associates from scientific institutions, the Ministry of Defense and the general staff of the Armed Forces. Emphasis is placed on the practical implementation of knowledge and skills which students acquire through lectures and exercises.

Teaching is organized in the contemporary equipped laboratories, cabinets, classrooms equipped with computers and Internet. The library and reading-rooms, with numerous publications of scientific-educational literature and fiction and the possibility of using the newest publications of technical journals, are at students' disposal. All programs which are organized at the Military Academy are in a complete accordance with the programs of studies which are organized at military academies in Europe.

Regardless of program taken and diplomas, cadets are commissioned second lieutenants or ensigns in the Serbian Armed Forces upon graduation.

Defence Management 

The aim of this program of studies is the adoption of academic knowledge and skills, and achieving competencies necessary to carry out initial branch – service officer duties, a platoon leader in accordance with the missions and tasks of Serbian Armed Forces, as well as for carrying out managerial duties in the defense system. The program includes areas that are necessary for acquiring defense management system basic theoretical knowledge, such as management, economic and organizational sciences. The elected modules are:

 Infantry
 Armored Units
 Artillery 
 Engineers 
 River Units 
 Anti-aircraft Defense Units
 Air Surveillance and Reporting

The cadet is awarded a Defense Management diploma.

Military-Mechanical Engineering 
Military - Mechanical Engineering is the Military Academy cadets' education for technical service officer core and mechanical engineering. Realization of this study program, enables future officers – mechanical engineers to resolve fundamental technical-technological problems in their initial command or staff duties that are in connection with maintenance and storage of arms and military equipment. The elected modules are:
 Weaponry and armament
 Combat vehicles

The cadet is awarded a Mechanical Engineering Diploma and Diploma's Supplement which means competencies of officers technical for technical service (Weaponry and Armament specialty or Combat Vehicles).

Military-Electronic Engineering 
Military - Electronic Engineering is designed for the education of cadets from the Military Academy for telecommunication and technical services officer core and computer science. Realization of this study program, enables future officers of telecommunications, technical services and computer sciences to resolve fundamental technical-technological problems in their initial duties, which are in connection with exploitation and maintenance of military electronic systems and means in its service and specialty. The elected modules are:

 Telecommunications
 Radar Systems
 Rocket and Fire Control Systems
 Information Systems

The cadet is awarded an Electronic Engineering Diploma. Except for diplomas, a cadet is awarded and a Diploma's Supplement, which determines cadet competencies for professional officer service in telecommunications, technical service (radar systems and missile systems specialty and fire control system) and Informatics.

Military-Chemical Engineering 
Military - Chemical Engineering is the Military Academy cadets' education for technical branches of officer core,  ordnance specialty and anti CBRN specialty, as well as technology engineers. Future officers - Military Chemical Engineers, depending on elected module, will be enabled to resolve fundamental technical-technological problems in their initial duties in the services and specialties, primarily to the platoon level, which are in connection with: Tech maintenance and ordnance storage, and technology of CBRN accidents sanitation in peace and war. The elected modules are:

 Ordnance specialty
 CBRN branch

The cadet is awarded a Chemical Engineering Diploma and Diploma's Supplement which determines officer competencies for technical service professional officer (Ordnance specialty) and CBRN branch.

Military Aviation 
Military Aviation is the Military Academy cadets' education for Air Force officers – aircraft and helicopter pilots as well as air traffic engineers.  Realization of this study program enables future Air Force officers - aircraft and helicopter pilots, to work on their initial duties of pilots in air detachments, then to carry out basic flying duties, as well as for the continued advanced air squadron level training. In addition, study program provides necessary competencies for performing the duties of an engineer in military aviation.

The cadet is awarded an Air Traffic Engineer Diploma and Diploma's Supplement which determines officer competencies for professional Air Force pilot.

Logistics 
Defence Logistics is to acquire academic knowledge and skills, and achieving competencies necessary to carry out initial duties of logistics officers in the defence system. Core courses of the program include courses of mathematics, social science, defence science, certain fields of technical-technological sciences and defense logistics.

The structure of the program includes theoretical knowledge required for successful defence logistics management (basic economics, microeconomics, logistics, organization, quality assurance, special logistic areas, military management, crisis management, resource management, financial business, material business, supply material management and electronic business). The elected modules are:
 Basic Logistics
 Supply Management
 Finance Management
 Transportation
 Maintenance

The cadet is awarded a Defence Logistics Manager Diploma and Diploma's Supplement which determines the cadet's competencies for professional officer in the service of the Serbian Armed Forces.

Master studies 
Master studies enable the cadet to expand the knowledge acquired at the graduate academic studies and to acquire the competence in fulfilling higher duties in a branch – service, as well as to perform the job of a graduate manager, i.e. a graduate engineer.

The studies last one year or two semesters during which the cadet obtains 60 ESPB.

After a successful graduation, a cadet is a graduate defense manager or a graduate engineer of a certain profile. Thus, the cadet will have gained all necessary conditions for reaching a better position in a profession and specialized training.

Master studies are carried out through four programs of studies:

 Defense Management
 Military - Mechanical Engineering
 Military - Electronic Engineering
 Military - Chemical Engineering

Specialization 
After the first degree studies and during the military career, officers can enrol academic and professional postgraduate training.

To officers, chosen by contest, along with parallel work in the units, the specialized training which represents a type of postgraduate education is enabled, and it can be done on specialized, master and doctoral studies.

National Defense School offers command and general-staff officer education for the highest duties in the Military of Serbia and the Ministry of Defense.

The forms of specialised training at the Military Academy are:
 General-staff specialised training
 Command specialised training

Campus 

The campus of the Academy is located at Banjica neighborhood in Belgrade. Besides main lecture buildings and cadet dormitory, on campus-facilities include stadium, indoor swimming pool, indoor athletics hall as well.

Chiefs

In popular culture 
The campus of the Military Academy was a center point of the popular television series Military Academy broadcast on Radio Television of Serbia from 2012 to 2017, and two movies, Military Academy 2 (2013) and Military Academy 3: New Beginning (2016). It was produced in cooperation with the Serbian Armed Forces and the Ministry of Defense.

References

External links 

 

Education in Belgrade
University of Defence
Savski Venac